A Book of Heroes (released in the Philippines as Fight to Win Again) is a 1986 Taiwanese-Hong Kong action comedy film directed by Kevin Chu, produced by Raymond Wong Pak-ming, and starring Yasuaki Kurata and Yukari Oshima.

Plot
Policeman Hu Pai and his girlfriend are on a quest to find stolen gold before the Yamashita gang can get to it. Meanwhile, Oshima Yamashita is unaware that his hired fighter is actually an undercover cop.

Cast
Yasuaki Kurata as Oshima Yamashita
Yukari Oshima as Yamashita's hired fighter
Hu Kua as Hu Pai
David Tao as David
Elsa Yang as Yang Shan Shan
Bin Bin as kid at bachelor club

Release
A Book of Heroes was released in Taiwan in 1986. In the Philippines, the film was released as Fight to Win Again by Pioneer Releasing on 25 August 1987, connecting it to the unrelated American film Fight to Win; posters credited Yukari Oshima and Yasuaki Kurata as Cynthia Luster and Shoji Karada respectively.

Home media
A Book of Heroes was first released on VCD in Hong Kong by Joy Sales on 22 November 2007; it has since gone out of print. The online store FLK Cinema, which originated in Clapham, London, also released the film on DVD-R (with the title Fight to Win Again).

Critical reception
The Encyclopedia of Martial Arts Movies authors Bill Palmer, Karen Palmer, and Ric Meyers gave the film three and a half out of four stars, indicating a "Very Good" quality.

References

External links

1986 films
1980s action comedy films
1986 action films
Hong Kong action comedy films
1980s Mandarin-language films
Taiwanese action comedy films
1980s Hong Kong films